Anton Kut Schlecker (born 28 October 1944, in Ehingen) is a German businessman, founder and owner of the Schlecker drug store chain in Germany.

He is married to Christa Schlecker and has two children, Lars Schlecker and Meike Schlecker, both active in the management of the Schlecker company.

At 21 he acquired the degree "Meister" butcher and took over the parental butcher's shop. In 1975 he built his first drug store in Kirchheim unter Teck. Two years later there were already more than 100 stores. , there were more than 13,000 stores across Europe, employing about 50,000 people and generating revenue of about 6.55 billion euros.

In July 2012 Anton Schlecker and his family declared bankruptcy and all Schlecker stores were been closed and were sold off to the appointed receivers.

Schlecker kidnapping 

In 1987 his two children – Meike and Lars – were kidnapped. After he paid 9.6 million marks in ransom they were released. In summer 1998, Wilhelm Hudelmaier and Herbert Jacoby were arrested in Ehingen and convicted of kidnapping. In 1999 they were convicted by the Landgericht Ulm of kidnapping and extortion.  They both were sentenced to a prison term of 13.5 years.

Court case 

In 1998 Schlecker and his wife were given a suspended sentence of ten months each and fined one million euros by the Regional Court in Stuttgart for deceiving Schlecker employees into believing they were paid according to going pay rates. Actual salaries were lower, which was deemed fraud by the court.

References

External links

"Familie Schlecker: Knüppeln, knausern, kontrollieren", Manager magazin, 4 December 2003 (in German)

1944 births
Living people
People from Ehingen
People from the Free People's State of Württemberg
German billionaires
German company founders
20th-century German businesspeople
21st-century German businesspeople